Gerber Products Company is an American purveyor of baby food and baby products headquartered in Florham Park, New Jersey, with plans to relocate to Arlington, Virginia. Gerber is a subsidiary of Nestlé.

Other Gerber products currently produced include breastfeeding supplies, such as the Premium Feeding System Manual Massaging Pump, as well as baby bottles and nipples. They also market a line of health care products, including Tooth and Gum Cleanser and Vitamin Drops.

History

Beginning and consolidation 

Gerber was founded in 1927 in Fremont, Michigan, by Daniel Frank Gerber, owner of the Fremont Canning Company, which produced canned fruit and vegetables. At the suggestion of a pediatrician, Gerber's wife, Dorothy, began making hand-strained food for their seven-month-old daughter, Sally. Recognising a business opportunity, Gerber began making baby food. By 1928 he had developed five products for the market: beef vegetable soup and strained peas, prunes, carrots, and spinach. Six months later, Gerber's baby foods were distributed nationwide.

Some believe that Dorothy Gerber was the initial inspiration behind their baby food products. One day after a visit to her infant daughter's pediatrician she toiled in the kitchen straining fruits and vegetables for her child. After much hard work she suggested to her husband Daniel, whose family already owned the Fremont Canning Company, to create this food in an industrial setting, lightening the load of mothers everywhere. A different interpretation of the story is that he was frustrated and upset having come home to find his wife looking strained and miserable in the kitchen. Not wanting to "exchange" his beautiful wife for this kitchen-bound monstrosity, he then invented the Gerber baby food product line.

The brand eventually became a major company in the baby food industry, currently offering more than 190 products in 80 countries, with labeling in 16 languages. Its primary competitors are Beech-Nut and Del Monte Foods. , Gerber controls 61 percent of the baby food market in the United States.

Product diversification 
In 1960, Gerber started selling its baby food in glass jars, which often found new life as household storage, especially in home workshops. Soon after, other items such as pacifiers, baby bottles, and small baby toys were introduced. In 2003 Gerber partially replaced the glass jars with plastic tubs for vegetables and some fruits. Other fruits and meats are still sold in jars.
 
In 1967, executives at Gerber Products decided to offer a line of life insurance products aimed at young families. Today, the Gerber Life Insurance Company is one of the largest purveyors of direct-marketed life insurance in the United States. Gerber Life currently has more than two million life insurance policies in force, with more than $650 million in assets. The company's term and whole life insurance products for adults and children are available in the United States, Puerto Rico, and most of Canada. Gerber Life currently has an "A" ("Excellent") rating with independent rating entity AM Best, the third-highest rating out of thirteen categories. In 2018, Gerber Life Insurance was sold to Western & Southern Financial Group, who continue to use the Gerber trademark under license.
 
Early in the 1990s, Gerber tried to enter into the sugar-free food market with a Sugar Free Vanilla Custard flavor, favorable to diabetic babies. The product did not see as much demand as expected, so it was dropped after a few years. Gerber also began to produce juices, which were still being sold as of March 2009. In 1999 Gerber established skincare products for babies.

Merger 
In 1994, Gerber merged with Sandoz Laboratories. Two years later, Sandoz merged with CIBA-Geigy to form Novartis, one of the largest pharmaceutical companies in the world. In 2007, Gerber was sold to Nestlé for $5.5 billion.

Consumer relations 
Gerber has a long history of projecting a family-friendly image. When Gerber Products established a consumer relations department in 1938, then ten-year-old Sally Gerber began answering each customer's letter individually, a practice she would continue for many years, even after she became a senior vice president of the company. In 1986 the company set up the Gerber Parents' Resource Center, a toll-free customer relations hotline, which has been providing information on baby food and parenting issues ever since.

Gerber Baby 

According to Gerber, Ann Turner Cook is the famous Gerber Baby whose portrait is featured prominently on all Gerber product packaging. Cook later retired from teaching and was a mystery writer. She was depicted in a charcoal sketch by her neighbor, Dorothy Hope Smith. Smith entered the sketch for the company's logo contest. A huge draw to the image of the Gerber baby is largely due to the fact that this baby is alone, not in the presence of adults, innocently peering straight into the eyes of the consumer. This innocent outward gaze was surely a marketing, if not psychological, technique to suck in female "mother-consumers". This forced many mothers to seek the happiness of their own child via the eyes of the iconic Gerber baby. Thus the notion that if their babies were fed Gerber, they would also be as content, smiley, and "cute" as the Gerber baby.

Tax break and expansion 

In September 2008, Gerber's Fremont facilities were designated as a Michigan Agricultural Renaissance Zone, receiving $43 million in tax breaks over 15 years. In order to receive the incentives, Gerber agreed to continue its employment in Fremont at 1,100 jobs and invest $50 million in its Fremont facilities over the course of the next ten years. However, to get the full 15 years of tax breaks, Gerber agreed to increase employment by 200 and spend a total of $75 million on its facilities.
The tax breaks have been largely supported, despite large revenue losses by local governments: $300,000 in losses per year for the City of Fremont (10% of their budget) and $160,000 a year for Newaygo County. It is estimated local governments would give up potentially $15 million in revenue over the 15 years as part of the tax break. Both the county and the city will be working with the Fremont Area Community Foundation to receive funds in the initial years to help with specific projects and programs. The Fremont Public School District would receive assistance through the state school aid formula. Nestlé Nutrition North America CEO Kurt Schmidt said that the Fremont research and development center will be one of 23 worldwide Nestlé "product technology centers" and also include scientific research for baby and infant nutritional products. It is expected that the new investment will help make Newaygo County a "global leader in scientific research".

Gerber products

See also
Gerber Singles

References

External links

 

1927 establishments in Michigan
1994 mergers and acquisitions
2007 mergers and acquisitions
American companies established in 1927
American subsidiaries of foreign companies
Baby food manufacturers
Companies based in Michigan
Companies based in Morris County, New Jersey
Florham Park, New Jersey
Food and drink companies based in Michigan
Food and drink companies based in New Jersey
Food and drink companies established in 1927
Nestlé brands
Newaygo County, Michigan